Ledebouria insularis is a species of plant that is endemic to Samhah, one of the islands of Socotra, part of Yemen.

Etymology 
Ledebouria is named for Carl Friedrich von Ledebour (1785-1851),  a botanist who published, among other things, the first complete Russian flora.

Sources

insularis
Endemic flora of Socotra
Endangered plants
Taxonomy articles created by Polbot
Plants described in 2004